Green Ridge is an unincorporated community in Scott County, in the U.S. state of Arkansas.

History
Green Ridge was founded in 1872.  A variant name is "Greenridge". A post office was established at Green Ridge in 1872, and remained in operation until 1938.

References

Unincorporated communities in Arkansas
Unincorporated communities in Scott County, Arkansas